Spindlin-1 is a protein that in humans is encoded by the SPIN1 gene.

References

Further reading